Paradystus ceylonicus is a species of beetle in the family Cerambycidae. It was described by Stephan von Breuning in 1954. It is known from Sri Lanka.

References

Saperdini
Beetles described in 1954